Life and Times 1982-1989 is the third compilation album by Canadian country music group Family Brown. It was released by RCA Records in 1989. The album includes eight previously released songs and two newly recorded tracks, "Pioneers" and "How Many Times".  "Pioneers" won two awards at the 1990 Canadian Country Music Association Awards including SOCAN Song of the Year and Video of the Year.

Track listing
All songs written by Barry Brown except where noted.

References

1989 compilation albums
Family Brown albums
RCA Records compilation albums